Nepaug State Forest is a Connecticut state forest located primarily in the town of New Hartford.

Recreation opportunities
The forest offers hiking, biking, cross-country skiing, fishing, camping,  letterboxing, and hunting. Trails that cross the forest include the blue-blazed Tunxis Trail.

Image gallery

References

External links

Nepaug State Forest Connecticut Department of Energy and Environmental Protection
Nepaug State Forest Camping Map Connecticut Department of Energy and Environmental Protection

Connecticut state forests
Parks in Litchfield County, Connecticut
New Hartford, Connecticut
Canton, Connecticut
Protected areas established in 1942
1942 establishments in Connecticut